Blue Day is a compilation album by English band Slowdive.

Blue Day may also refer to:

"Blue Day" (Mi-Sex song),  1984 
"Blue Day" (Suggs song), 1997
"Blue Day", a 2001 song by American Hi-Fi from American Hi-Fi

See also
"Blue Blue Day"
"Blue Morning, Blue Day"
Born on a Blue Day, a memoir by autistic savant Daniel Tammet
Blue Monday (disambiguation)